Luis R. Figueroa (born February 16, 1974 in Bayamón, Puerto Rico) is a former professional infielder. He is a cousin of former major leaguer José Hernández.

Career

Claimed off waivers by the New York Mets that August 15, on April 5, Figueroa was part of a 7-player trade that sent him, Saúl Rivera, Bruce Chen, and Dicky Gonzalez to the Montreal Expos for Scott Strickland, Phil Seibel, and Matt Watson. From –, Figueroa played in the Expos, Mets, Brewers, and Red Sox organizations.

In , he signed a minor league contract with the Toronto Blue Jays, playing most of the season with their Syracuse SkyChiefs, but was called up to play in 8 games.

Figueroa signed a minor league contract with the San Francisco Giants for the  season, appearing in 6 more major league games, then signed a minor league contract with the Chicago Cubs in 2008. In December 2008, he signed a minor league contract with the Los Angeles Angels of Anaheim.

In March 2010, he signed a minor league contract with the Blue Jays. He split the 2009 season between the Arizona League Angels, and the Salt Lake Bees.

The Milwaukee Brewers signed Figueroa to a minor league contract on April 17, 2011. He was released in early May.

On May 11, 2011, Figueroa was signed to a minor league deal by the New York Mets. He last played in 2012 for the independent Sugar Land Skeeters.

References

External links

1974 births
Living people
Altoona Curve players
Arizona League Angels players
Augusta GreenJackets players
Brevard County Manatees players
Buffalo Bisons (minor league) players
Carolina Mudcats players
Edmonton Trappers players
Fresno Grizzlies players
Guerreros de Oaxaca players
Harrisburg Senators players
Indianapolis Indians players
Iowa Cubs players
Las Vegas 51s players
Lynchburg Hillcats players
Major League Baseball second basemen
Major League Baseball players from Puerto Rico
Mexican League baseball second basemen
Mexican League baseball shortstops
Nashville Sounds players
Norfolk Tides players
Ottawa Lynx players
Pawtucket Red Sox players
Sportspeople from Bayamón, Puerto Rico
Pittsburgh Pirates players
Puerto Rican expatriate baseball players in Canada
Puerto Rican expatriate baseball players in Mexico
San Francisco Giants players
Salt Lake Bees players
Sugar Land Skeeters players
Syracuse SkyChiefs players
Toronto Blue Jays players
2013 World Baseball Classic players
Bridgeport Bluefish players
Cangrejeros de Santurce (baseball) players
Criollos de Caguas players
Indios de Mayagüez players
Tigres de Aragua players
Puerto Rican expatriate baseball players in Venezuela